Roknodin Javadi (born 1957) is an Iranian politician and business executive.

He is a former CEO of National Iranian Oil Company and Deputy oil minister of iran and the Chairman of National Iranian South Oil Company.

Javadi served as Managing Director of National Iranian Gas Export Company (NIGEC) during ex-president Mohammad Khatami`s administration, who signed Crescent Gas Contract on behalf of the Iran's Oil Ministry.

In September 2013 Javadi was appointed as the managing director and CEO of National Iranian Oil Company (NIOC) and as deputy oil minister by Iran's oil minister Bijan Namdar Zanganeh. He succeeded former NIOC CEO Ahmad Ghalebani.

Javadi served as NIOC’s CEO until he resigned in June 2016. He was succeeded by Ali Kardor. Javadi still serves as Vice-chairman of the Board. Following his work as CEO for NIOC Javadi began serving as the Ministry of Petroleum's deputy managing director for monitoring hydrocarbon resources. He regularly appeared on national and international media.

References 

Iranian businesspeople
1957 births
Living people
Petroleum University of Technology alumni
Iranian chief executives
Iranian electronics engineers
Iranian engineers
Iranian business executives
National Iranian Oil Company people